In mathematics, Casey's theorem, also known as the generalized Ptolemy's theorem, is a theorem in Euclidean geometry named after the Irish mathematician John Casey.

Formulation of the theorem

Let  be a circle of radius . Let  be (in that order) four non-intersecting circles that lie inside  and tangent to it. Denote by  the length of the exterior common bitangent of the circles . Then:

Note that in the degenerate case, where all four circles reduce to points, this is exactly Ptolemy's theorem.

Proof 

The following proof is attributable to Zacharias. We will use the notation  for the centers of the circles.
Note that from Pythagorean theorem,

We will try to express this length in terms of the points . By the law of cosines in triangle ,

Since the circles  tangent to each other:

Let  be a point on the circle . According to the law of sines in triangle :

Therefore,

and substituting these in the formula above:

And finally, the length we seek is

We can now evaluate the left hand side, with the help of the original Ptolemy's theorem applied to the inscribed quadrilateral :

Further generalizations 

It can be seen that the four circles need not lie inside the big circle. In fact, they may be tangent to it from the outside as well. In that case, the following change should be made:

The converse of Casey's theorem is also true. That is, if equality holds, the circles are tangent to a common circle.

Applications

Casey's theorem and its converse can be used to prove a variety of statements in Euclidean geometry. For example, the shortest known proof of Feuerbach's theorem uses the converse theorem.

References

External links

 
 Shailesh Shirali: "'On a generalized Ptolemy Theorem'". In: Crux Mathematicorum, Vol. 22, No. 2, pp. 49-53

Theorems about circles
Euclidean geometry
Articles containing proofs